The mayor of Chicago is the chief executive of city government in Chicago, Illinois, the third-largest city in the United States. The mayor is responsible for the administration and management of various city departments, submits proposals and recommendations to the Chicago City Council, is active in the enforcement of the city's ordinances, submits the city's annual budget and appoints city officers, department commissioners or directors, and members of city boards and commissions.

During sessions of the city council, the mayor serves as the presiding officer. The mayor is not allowed to vote on issues except in certain instances, most notably where the vote taken on a matter before the body results in a tie.

The office of mayor was created when Chicago became a city in 1837.

History

The first mayor was William Butler Ogden (1837–1838). Forty-five men and two women (Jane Byrne, 1979–1983, Lori Lightfoot, 2019–), have held the office.  Two sets of father and son have been elected Mayor of Chicago: Carter Harrison, Sr. (1893) and Carter Harrison, Jr. (1897–1905, 1911–1915), as well as Richard J. Daley (1955–1976) and Richard M. Daley (1989–2011). Carter Harrison, Jr. was the first mayor to have been born in the city.

As an interim mayor, David Duvall Orr had the shortest mayoral term. Richard M. Daley was elected six times becoming Chicago's longest-serving mayor, surpassing his father's record.

The first Irish Catholic mayor was John Patrick Hopkins (1893–1895), and Rahm Emanuel (2011–2019) is the only Jewish American to have served as mayor.

Harold Washington (1983–1987) was the first African American mayor. Current Mayor Lightfoot (sworn in May 2019) is the city's first African American woman and first LGBT mayor.

Appointment powers
The mayor appoints the commissioner of the Chicago Fire Department, the superintendent of the Chicago Police Department and  the heads of other departments, the largest of which are the Water Management Department (formed by the consolidation of the former Water Department and Sewer Department under Richard M. Daley), and the Streets & Sanitation Department. The mayor also appoints members to the boards of several special-purpose governmental bodies including City Colleges of Chicago, Chicago Park District, Chicago Public Library, Chicago Housing Authority, Chicago Transit Authority, and the Metropolitan Pier and Exposition Authority. Under Richard M. Daley, the Illinois legislature granted the mayor power to appoint the governing board and chief executive officer of the Chicago Public Schools and subordinated the district to the mayor; the district had long been an independent unit of government.

The Chicago City Clerk and City Treasurer of Chicago are elected separately, as are the 50 aldermen who form the city council. The mayor is empowered, however, to fill vacancies in any of these 52 elected offices by appointment. In turn, the city council elects one of its own to fill a mayoral vacancy.

By charter, Chicago has a "weak-mayor" system, in which most of the power is vested in the city council. In practice, however, the mayor of Chicago has long been one of the most powerful municipal chief executives in the nation.  Unlike in most other weak-mayor systems, the mayor has the power to draw up the budget.  For most of the 20th century, before the decline of patronage and the mayor's office becoming officially nonpartisan in 1999, the mayor was the de facto leader of the city's Democratic Party, and had great influence over the ward organizations.   Located in City Hall, "the fifth floor" is sometimes used as a metonym for the office and power of the mayor.

Election and succession

The mayor of Chicago is elected by popular vote every four years, on the last Tuesday in February. A run-off election, in case no candidate garners more than fifty percent of the vote, is held on the first Tuesday in April. The election is held on a non-partisan basis. Chicago is the largest city in the United States not to limit the term of service for its mayor.

In accordance with Illinois law, the city council elects a vice mayor who serves as interim mayor in the event of a vacancy in the office of the mayor or the inability of the mayor to serve due to illness or injury, until the city council elects one of its members acting mayor or until the mayoral term expires. As of May 2019, the current vice mayor is Tom Tunney. However, if a vacancy occurs in the office of mayor with more than 28 months remaining in the mayoral term and at least 130 days before the next general municipal election, then a special election must be held to choose a new mayor to serve out the remainder of the term at that general municipal election; if a vacancy occurs with fewer than 28 months remaining in the mayoral term or fewer than 130 days before the next general municipal election, then the acting mayor serves as mayor until the mayoral term expires.

The order-of succession involving the vice mayor was made concrete following disputes that arose in the aftermath of the death in office of Richard J. Daley, and was subsequently implemented following the death in office of Harold Washington, which saw Vice Mayor David Orr become acting mayor. Prior to this, the city had vague succession laws which indicated that the president pro tempore of the City Council would succeed as mayor. This was not followed after the death of Daley, and the city council appointed Michael Bilandic acting mayor instead of having pro tempore Wilson Frost become mayor, due to City Corporation Counsel William R. Quinlan ruling that, since the city did not have a statute specifically outlining succession, the City Council would need to elect the interim mayor.

Six instances have seen the City Council appoint either an acting mayor, acting mayor pro tempore, or interim mayor.

In the absence of the mayor during meetings of the city council, the president pro tempore of the city council, who is a member of and elected by the city council, acts as presiding officer. Unlike the mayor, the president pro tempore can vote on all legislative matters. If neither the mayor nor pro tempore can preside, the vice mayor presides.

List of mayors

Between 1833 and 1837, Chicago was incorporated as a town and headed by town presidents. Since 1837, it has been incorporated as a city and headed by mayors.

The mayoral term in Chicago was one year from 1837 through 1863, when it was changed to two years. In 1907, it was changed again, this time to four years. Until 1861, municipal elections were held in March. In that year, legislation moved them to April. In 1869, however, election day was changed to November, and terms expiring in April of that year were changed. In 1875, election day was moved back to April by the city's vote to operate under the Cities and Villages Act of 1872.

† Died/murdered in office.
1 Since 1999, mayoral elections have officially been nonpartisan. A 1995 Illinois law stipulated that "candidates for mayor ... no longer would run under party labels in Chicago". However, Richard M. Daley, Rahm Emanuel and Lori Lightfoot are known to be Democrats.

Vice mayor

In accordance with Illinois law, the city council elects a vice mayor who serves as interim mayor in the event of a vacancy in the office of the mayor or the inability of the mayor to serve due to illness or injury, until the city council elects one of its members acting mayor or until the mayoral term expires. The current vice mayor is Tom Tunney.

The position was created by state law after the power struggle following Richard J. Daley's death in office.

The position is considered to be largely ceremonial.

If neither the mayor nor president pro tempore can preside over a City Council meeting, then the vice mayor presides.

List of vice mayors

See also

 Law and government of Chicago
 Timeline of Chicago history

References

Further reading
 Banfield, Edward C. Political Influence (1961), covers major public issues 1957 to 1958 in Chicago
 Becker, Richard Edward. "Edward Dunn, Reform Mayor Of Chicago: 1905-1907" (PhD dissertation, The University of Chicago; ProQuest Dissertations Publishing, 1971.T-22350).
 Bennett, Larry. “The Mayor among His Peers: Interpreting Richard M. Daley.” in The City, Revisited: Urban Theory from Chicago, Los Angeles, and New York, ed. by Dennis R. Judd and Dick Simpson, (2011), pp. 242–72. online

 Biles, Roger. Mayor Harold Washington: Champion of Race and Reform in Chicago (U of Illinois Press, 2018). online
 Biles, Roger. Big City Boss in Depression and War: Mayor Edward J. Kelly of Chicago (1984).
 Biles, William Roger. "Mayor Edward J. Kelly Of Chicago: Big City Boss in Depression and War" (Phd Dissertation, University Of Illinois at Chicago. Proquest Dissertations Publishing, 1981 .8120559).

 Bradley, Donald S., and Mayer N. Zald. "From commercial elite to political administrator: The recruitment of the mayors of Chicago." American Journal of Sociology 71.2 (1965): 153-167. online
 Bradley, Donald S. The historical trends of the political elites and metropolitan Central City: the Chicago mayors (1963)

 Bukowski, Douglas.  Big Bill Thompson, Chicago, and the Politics of Image (1998)
 Bukowski, Douglas. "William Dever and Prohibition: The mayoral election of 1923 and 1927" Chicago History 7#2 (1978) pp. 109-118

 Byrne, Jane. My Chicago (Northwestern University Press, 2004), a primary source.
 Carl, Jim. " '‘Good Politics Is Good Government': The Troubling History of Mayoral Control of the Public Schools in Twentieth‐Century Chicago." American Journal of Education 115#2, 2009, pp. 305–36. online
 Cohen, Adam, and Elizabeth Taylor. American pharaoh: Mayor Richard J. Daley, his battle for Chicago and the nation (2001). online review; also see excerpt
 Fehrenbacher, Don E. “Lincoln and the Mayor of Chicago.” Wisconsin Magazine of History 40#4 (1957), pp. 237–44. online, on Long John Wentworth

 Gottfried, Alex. Boss Cermak of Chicago: A Study of Political Leadership (U of Washington Press, 1962).

 Green, Paul M., and Holli, Melvin G. The Mayors: The Chicago Political Tradition (4th ed. 2013), scholarly biographies excerpt covers Medill, Harrison II, Dunne, Busse, Thompson, Dever, Cermak, Kelly, Kennelly, both Daleys, Bilandic, Byrne, Washington, and Emanuel.

 Harrison, Carter Henry. Stormy Years: The Autobiography of Carter H. Harrison, Five Times Mayor of Chicago (1935), a primary source.
 Johnson, Claudius O. Carter Henry Harrison I: Political Leader (1928) online
 Jones, Gene Delon. "The Origin of the Alliance Between the New Deal and the Chicago Machine." Journal of the Illinois State Historical Society 67 (1974) pp 253-274.
 Kleppner, Paul. Chicago Divided: The Making of a Black Mayor (1985)

 Lydersen, Kari. Mayor 1%: Rahm Emanuel and the Rise of Chicago's 99% ( Haymarket Books, 2013).
 Koeneman, Keith. First Son: The Biography of Richard M. Daley (University of Chicago Press, 2013).
 McCarthy, Michael P. "Prelude to Armageddon: Charles E. Merriam and the Chicago Mayoral Election of 1911." Journal of the Illinois State Historical Society 67#5 (1974), pp. 505–18. online
 Marshall, Jon, and Matthew Connor. "Divided Loyalties: The Chicago Defender and Harold Washington’s Campaign for Mayor of Chicago." American Journalism 36.4 (2019): 447-472.

 Morton, Richard Allen. Justice and Humanity: Edward F. Dunne, Illinois Progressive. (SIU Press, 1997).
 Morton, Richard Allen. "Justice and humanity: The politics of Edward F. Dunne' (PhD dissertation, University of Illinois at Urbana-Champaign ProQuest Dissertations Publishing,  1988. 8823207). Mayor 1905 to 1907

  O'Malley, Peter Joseph. "Mayor Martin H. Kennelly of Chicago: A Political Biography" (PhD dissertation, University of Illinois at Chicago, ProQuest Dissertations Publishing, 1980. 8023247).
 Preston, Michael B. “The Election of Harold Washington: Black Voting Patterns in the 1983 Chicago Mayoral Race.” PS 16#3 1983, pp. 486–88. online
 Rex, Frederick. The mayors of the city of Chicago from 1837 to 1933 (1947).
 Schottenhamel, George. "How Big Bill Thompson Won Control of Chicago." Journal of the Illinois State Historical Society 45.1 (1952): 30-49. online

 Schmidt, John R. The Mayor Who Cleaned up Chicago: A Political Biography of William E. Dever (1989)

 Shipps, Dorothy. “Updating Tradition: The Institutional Underpinnings of Modern Mayoral Control in Chicago’s Public Schools.” in When Mayors Take Charge: School Governance in the City, edited by Joseph P. Viteritti, (Brookings Institution Press, 2009), pp. 117–47. online

 Simpson, Dick. The Good Fight: Life Lessons from a Chicago Progressive (2017), a primary source. excerpt
 Simpson, Dick. Rogues, Rebels, and Rubber Stamps: The Politics of the Chicago City Council, 1863 to the Present. (2018)
 Simpson, Dick, Melissa Mouritsen, and Betty O’Shaughnessy. "Chicago: The Election of Rahm Emanuel." in Local Politics and Mayoral Elections in 21st Century America (Routledge, 2014) pp. 99-115.

 Spirou, Costas. Building the City of Spectacle: Mayor Richard M. Daley and the Remaking of Chicago (Cornell UP, 2016) online

 Tompkins, C. David. "John Peter Altgeld as a Candidate for Mayor of Chicago in 1899." Journal of the Illinois State Historical Society 56.4 (1963): 654-676. online
 Wendt, Lloyd and Herman Kogan. Big Bill of Chicago (1953) Popular biography of Big Bill Thompson online
 Zald, Mayer N., and Thomas A. Anderson. "Secular Trends and Historical Contingencies in the Recruitment of Mayors: Nashville as Compared to New Haven and Chicago." Urban Affairs Quarterly 3#4 (1968): 53-68.

External links 
 Mayor's official webpage
  "History of Chicago's mayoral office" from Ballotpedia

1837 establishments in Illinois
Government of Chicago
Chicago